John Brian Jarvis (26 August 1933 – January 2004) was a Welsh professional footballer who played as a wing half. He played in the English Football League for Wrexham and Oldham Athletic.

References

1933 births
2004 deaths
Welsh footballers
Association football wing halves
Wrexham A.F.C. players
Oldham Athletic A.F.C. players
Altrincham F.C. players
English Football League players
Sportspeople from Wrexham County Borough